At Bay Press is a Canadian trade book publishing company, based in Winnipeg, Manitoba, established in 2008 in Toronto, Ontario that specializes in contemporary fiction, including some poetry and non-fiction. The press is keenly interested in titles by emerging or overlooked authors. 

In addition to their trade book publishing business, the press is known for their finely crafted handmade artisan books sought out by book collectors. The company is a member of the Association of Canadian Publishers, the Association of the Manitoba Book Publishers, Canadian Book Binders and Book Artists Guild and the Fine Press Book Association. Many of the books published by the press are held in permanent government, public and private collections worldwide.

The press garnered attention from various press and media in 2015 when one of its titles, Woman – An Anthology, won the Independent Publisher Book Award gold medal for Outstanding Book of the Year. The book features contributions by Stephen King, Nobel Prize winning author Alice Munro, Giller Prize winning author Lynn Coady, Peter O'Donnell, creator of the famed literary character Modesty Blaise, as well as many other well known authors.

The press is also noted for its thoughtful and essential poetry, such as its title Stars by Lucy Haché with illustrations by Michael Joyal, which was selected by CBC as one of the 12 best books of poetry in 2018.

References

External links
At Bay Press

Book publishing companies of Canada
Publishing companies established in 2008
Small press publishing companies
Companies based in Winnipeg